Sean Price Williams is an American cinematographer. Born in Wilmington, Delaware, he is based in New York.

Career
Williams is known for his textured, fluid camerawork (often handheld) and a heightened attention to available light. The New Yorker film critic Richard Brody described Williams (in a memorial appraisal of documentary filmmaker Albert Maysles, for whom Williams served extensively as cameraman) as "the cinematographer for many of the best and most significant independent films of the past decade, fiction and documentary — including Frownland, Yeast, Fake It So Real, The Color Wheel, Young Bodies Heal Quickly, Listen Up Philip, the Safdie brothers' ... Heaven Knows What, and Alex Ross Perry's new [as of 2015] feature Queen of Earth."

In a 2013 article for Film.com, critic Calum Marsh deemed Williams "micro-budget filmmaking's most exciting cinematographer." Marsh would go on to write in a 2014 article in Toronto's National Post that "Williams, in particular, has proven indispensable to the [2010s American independent film] movement, and over the past several years has distinguished dozens of the films with his all but peerless talent for photography, from experimental nonfiction work like Maiko Endo's Kuichisan to more conventional comedies like Bob Byington's Somebody Up There Likes Me."

Along with other celebrated figures of the New York independent film scene such as Perry, Kate Lyn Sheil, Robert Greene, Luke Oleksa, and Michael M. Bilandic, Williams was a long-time employee of famed New York video and music store Kim's Video and Music.

In 2020, Williams began preparing for his feature film directorial debut, The Sweet East from a script by film critic Nick Pinkerton. The film will feature Jacob Elordi.

Filmography

Feature films

 Frownland (2007)
 Yeast (2008)
 Impolex (2009)
 Beetle Queen Conquers Tokyo (2009)
 Mulberry Street (2010)
 The Color Wheel (2011)
 Kuichisan (2012)
 Somebody Up There Likes Me (2012)
 The Black Balloon (2012)
 If You Take This (2014)
 The Vanquishing of the Witch Baba Yaga (2014)
 Listen Up Philip (2014)
 Iris (2014)
 Young Bodies Heal Quickly (2014)
 Heaven Knows What (2014)
 Queen of Earth (2015)
 Christmas, Again (2015)
 Sin Alas (2015)
 Kate Plays Christine (2016)
 Good Time (2017)
 Thirst Street (2017)
 Golden Exits (2017)
 Marjorie Prime (2017)
 Wobble Palace (2018)
 The Great Pretender (2018)
 Her Smell (2018)
 One Man Dies a Million Times (2019)
 Tesla (2020)
 Ainu Mosir (2020)
 Zeros and Ones (2021)
 Funny Pages (2022)

References

External links
 

American cinematographers
People from Wilmington, Delaware
Year of birth missing (living people)
Living people